The Journal of Contemporary China is a multidisciplinary peer-reviewed academic journal on contemporary Chinese affairs. It is published five times per year by Routledge and covers issues such as Chinese politics, law, economy, culture, and foreign policy, among others. It is purported to be the only English-language journal edited in North America that provides exclusive information about contemporary Chinese affairs for scholars, business people and government policy-makers. 

Its current editor-in-chief is Suisheng Zhao (Josef Korbel School of International Studies, University of Denver). Some scholars affiliated with the journal have also contributed to articles from Brookings and the Center for Strategic and International Studies.

Abstracting and indexing
The journal is abstracted and indexed in the Social Sciences Citation Index and is listed in the Journal Citation Reports with an impact factor of 0.953 in the category "Area Studies" in 2013. It is also indexed in America: History & Life, British Humanities Index, CSA Abstracts, GEOBASE, Historical Abstracts, International Political Science Abstracts, International Development Abstracts, and MLA International Bibliography.

References

External links
 

English-language journals
Chinese studies journals
Taylor & Francis academic journals
Publications established in 1992
5 times per year journals